Club de Fútbol América S.A. de C.V. Premier is a professional football team that plays in the Mexican Football League. They are currently playing in the Liga Premier (Mexico's Third Division). Club América Premier is affiliated with Club América who plays in the Liga MX, both play in Mexico's capital, Mexico City.

Players

Current squad

Honors

Domestic Competitions
Segunda Division de Mexico
Liga Premier de Ascenso
Runner-up (1): Clausura 2007
Liga de Nuevos Talentos de Mexico
Winners (1): Clausura 2009

References

External links

Football clubs in Mexico City
Liga Premier de México